Pet ownership carries significance within the LGBT community. In recent years, there has been more academic attention placed on "the intersections of human and animal lives in the context of LGBT communities".

Background 
In the United States, LGBT adults were more likely to own pets than heterosexual adults in 2007, and child-free LGBT households are more likely to own pets than child-free heterosexual households.

Cats and lesbian feminism 
Cats have been used as a "lazy visual shorthand" within popular culture to "[signify] clichés about effeminate gay men and lonely lesbian women". The urban myth that lesbians are likely to have cats at home took hold within early lesbian feminism; cats were said to exhibit "spirited feline self-sufficiency" which made them "an essential accoutrement to all lesbian's lives, providing a mirror to their owners' challenge to the hetero-patriarchal social order". On the other hand, some took the view that pet ownership was oppressive, and took objection to a form of lesbian feminism that "[fought] against the oppression of women, whilst remaining silent on the oppression of animals."

Pets as emotional support 

Gay and bisexual men may be more likely look to pets as means of support, as they are more likely to live alone and less likely to have children than heterosexual men. Among older LGBT populations, pets may have a positive impact on a person's mental health and feeling of social support. A 1999 study shows that gay men with HIV/AIDS were less likely to be depressed. A 2019 study shows that pet ownership may act as a net stressor on gay and bisexual men with prostate cancer.

See also 

 Homosexual behavior in animals
 LGBT parenting

References

Pets
LGBT culture